The Wild Tchoupitoulas is a 1976 album by the New Orleans Mardi Gras Indian tribe The Wild Tchoupitoulas. While not a commercial success, the effort was well received critically and the experience recording it encouraged the four Neville brothers to perform together for the first time as a group.

Background
The word Tchoupitoulas is derived from the name of an Indian tribe and is believed to mean "those who live at the river". According to Library of Congress, "Since the 19th century, bands of African-Americans in New Orleans have masqueraded as American Indians during Mardi Gras. They wear elaborate, homemade costumes planned and constructed throughout the year preceding the celebration, and take to the streets chanting merry boasts about their tribes. Their music is one of the many rich strands of New Orleans music, and Indians themselves are celebrated in many songs originating in the city."

Music and lyrics 
The album features the "call-and-response" style chants typical of Mardi Gras Indians. Vocals were provided by George Landry, as "Big Chief Jolly", as well as other members of his Mardi Gras tribe. Instrumentation was provided in part by members of the New Orleans band The Meters. The album also notably features Landry's nephews, the Neville Brothers, providing harmonies and some of the instrumentation. Meaningful of the geographic location of New Orleans as a Caribbean city, "Meet de Boys on the Battlefront" is based on the melody and rhythm of Trinidadian calypso artist Lord Invader's 1943 "Rum and Coca Cola" made famous in the U.S. by The Andrews Sisters in 1944.

Critical reception 
In 2012, the album was added to the U.S. Library of Congress' National Registry, a designation of "cultural, artistic and historic importance to the nation's aural legacy."

Reviewing in AllMusic, Stephen Erlewine ranked the album among New Orleans greats and wrote: the group "locks into an extraordinary hybrid that marries several indigenous New Orleans musics, with swampy, dirty funk taking its place in the forefront. There are only eight songs, and they are all strung together as if they're variations on the same themes and rhythms. That's a compliment, by the way, since the organic, flowing groove is the key to the album's success."

Robert Christgau placed the album on his top six New Orleans classics list. He called the music "ecstatic" and "celebratory". Reviewing in Christgau's Record Guide (1981), he wrote: "Here we have eight songs about dressing up in Indian costume on Mardi Gras; many of them are also about fighting with other Indians. You've probably heard the [Louisiana Creole] before, and maybe the irresistible melodic elements, too, although I can't tell any more, because I've played this 'repetitive' record so many times it sounds like where they all started (which it may be). For a while, I believed side two inferior, but eventually a longing for 'Big Chief Got a Golden Crown' set in and now I prefer it for listening. Side one is the best non- (or anti-) disco dance music in years."

Track listing
All tracks composed by George Landry, except as noted.

Personnel
Credits adapted from AllMusic, Discogs and Louisiana Music Factory.

Composition and arrangement
George Landry – composer
Art Neville – arrangement
Charles Neville – arrangement
Vocals and tribe roles
Big Chief Jolly – George Landry
Second Chief – Norman Bell
Trail Chief – Booker T. Washington
Flag Boy – Candy Hemphill "Carl" Christmas
Spy Boy – Amos Landry
Performance
Art Neville – keyboards, background vocals, producer, composer (track 4)
Charles Neville – percussion, background vocals, producer
Cyril Neville – congas, background vocals, composer (tracks 1, 8)
Aaron Neville – piano, background vocals
Ziggy Modeliste – drums, composer (track 4)
Leo Nocentelli – guitar, composer (track 4)
George Porter Jr. – bass, composer (track 4)
Teddy Royal – guitar
Willie Harper – background vocals
Production
Allen Toussaint – producer 
Marshall Sehorn – producer 
Roberta Grace – engineer
Ken Laxton – engineer, remastering, remixing
Paul A. Howrilla – album jacket design and photography
Carleatis – artwork
Photographique Studios – design
Ruth Kaplan – CD art adaptation

See also
Rumble: The Indians Who Rocked the World

Further reading
 Archive

References

The Wild Tchoupitoulas albums
1976 debut albums
Albums produced by Allen Toussaint
Mango Records albums
Albums recorded at Sea-Saint Studios
United States National Recording Registry recordings
United States National Recording Registry albums